Mariaan de Swardt and Ruxandra Dragomir won in the final 6–3, 7–5 against Kerry-Anne Guse and Patricia Hy-Boulais.

Seeds
Champion seeds are indicated in bold text while text in italics indicates the round in which those seeds were eliminated.

 Laura Golarsa /  Caroline Vis (quarterfinals)
 Debbie Graham /  Jill Hetherington (quarterfinals)
 Åsa Carlsson /  Patty Fendick (quarterfinals)
 Maria Lindström /  Maria Strandlund (quarterfinals)

Draw

External links
 1995 Rover British Clay Court Championships Doubles Draw

Women's Doubles
Doubles
Rover